Acrojana rosacea is a moth in the family Eupterotidae. It was described by Arthur Gardiner Butler in 1874. It is found in Ghana.

References

Endemic fauna of Ghana
Moths described in 1874
Janinae